The 1916 Ashton-under-Lyne by-election was a by-election held on 23 December 1916 for the British House of Commons constituency of Ashton-under-Lyne.

Summary

The Conservative Albert Stanley was the only candidate nominated and was therefore declared elected unopposed.

In exchange for his cession of the Conservative seat, the town's Conservative Party Member of Parliament (MP) Sir Max Aitken was elevated to the peerage as Baron Beaverbrook.

See also 
 List of United Kingdom by-elections
 Ashton-under-Lyne constituency
 1920 Ashton-under-Lyne by-election
 1928 Ashton-under-Lyne by-election
 1931 Ashton-under-Lyne by-election
 1939 Ashton-under-Lyne by-election
 1945 Ashton-under-Lyne by-election

References 

Ashton-under-Lyne by-election
Ashton-under-Lyne by-election
1910s in Lancashire
Ashton-under-Lyne 1916
Ashton-under-Lyne 1916
Ashton-under-Lyne 1916
Ashton-under-Lyne by-election